The Naturalization Act of 1798 (enacted June 18, 1798) passed by the United States Congress, to amend the residency and notice periods of the previous Naturalization Act of 1795. It increased the period necessary for aliens to become naturalized citizens in the United States from 5 to 14 years and the Declaration of Intention from 3 to 5 years.

Although the law was passed under the guise of protecting national security, most historians conclude it was really intended to decrease the number of citizens, and thus voters, who disagreed with the Federalist Party. At the time, most immigrants supported Thomas Jefferson and the Democratic-Republicans, the political rivals of the Federalists. It had only limited effect, however, as many immigrants rushed to become naturalized before the Act went into effect, and states could at the time make their own more lenient naturalization laws.

The Act was controversial at the time, even within the Federalist Party, as many Federalists feared it would discourage immigration. It was repealed in 1802 by the Naturalization Law of 1802, which restored the residency and notice period of the previous Naturalization Act of 1795.

A number of changes were made to the previous naturalization law:

The "notice time" refers to the period that immigrants had to wait after declaring their intent to become a citizen. The "residence period" refers to the period they had to live in the United States before they could become a citizen. The Naturalization Act of 1798 is considered one of the Alien and Sedition Acts, together with three other laws passed contemporaneously in 1798 (the Alien Friends Act, Alien Enemies Act, and Sedition Act). Like the Naturalization Acts of 1790 and 1795, the 1798 act also restricted citizenship to "free white persons".

The act is the first to maintain records of immigration and residence, and provided certificates of residence for white immigrant aliens, for the purpose of establishing the date of arrival for subsequent qualification for citizenship.

References

External links
 Statutes at Large, 5th Congress, 2nd Session: Naturalization Act
 Text of the act

1798 in American law
United States federal immigration and nationality legislation
Presidency of John Adams
Repealed United States legislation